Nymphoides hydrophylla, commonly known as crested floating-heart, is an aquatic plant of the family Menyanthaceae native to tropical Asia. It has cordate floating leaves that support a lax inflorescence of dainty white flowers with fringed petal margins. Its slim stem (spear) is edible, and is used as vegetable in Taiwan, mostly produced at Meinong District, Kaohsiung.

Flowers of N.  hydrophylla are gynodioecious. The fruit is a capsule bearing many flattened seeds.

The plants are commonly sold for use in ornamental water gardens. Outside their native range they can escape cultivation and become nuisance weeds, particularly in Florida. They are not killed by freezing, and have been reported in Lake Marion, South Carolina.

References

hydrophylla
Freshwater plants
Garden plants
Flora of China
Flora of the Indian subcontinent
Flora of Indo-China
Flora of Taiwan